Ghulam Mustafa Bashir (born 4 July 1987) is a Pakistani sports shooter. He represented Pakistan in the men's 25 metre rapid fire pistol event at the 2016 Rio Olympics
and the  2020 Tokyo Olympics. He was the flag-bearer for Pakistan during the Parade of Nations.

References

External links
 

1987 births
Living people
Pakistani male sport shooters
Olympic shooters of Pakistan
Shooters at the 2016 Summer Olympics
Place of birth missing (living people)
Shooters at the 2014 Asian Games
Shooters at the 2018 Asian Games
Asian Games competitors for Pakistan
South Asian Games medalists in shooting
Shooters at the 2020 Summer Olympics
21st-century Pakistani people